Agriphila ruricolella, the lesser vagabond sod webworm, is a moth in the family Crambidae. It was described by Philipp Christoph Zeller in 1863. It is found in North America, where it has been recorded from Quebec and Maine to South Carolina, west to Arizona and north to Alberta. The habitat consists of grasslands, weedy areas, fields and cultivated areas.

The wingspan is 18–20 mm. The forewings are pale yellowish with reddish-brown speckling between the veins. Adults are on wing from July to September in one generation per year.

The larvae feed on various grasses, as well as Rumex acetosella. The species overwinters in the larval stage.

References

Crambini
Moths described in 1863
Moths of North America